William Woods (born December 29, 1998) is an American professional baseball pitcher in the New York Mets organization. He has played in Major League Baseball (MLB) with the Atlanta Braves.

Amateur career
Woods attended Peabody High School in Trenton, Tennessee, where he pitched to a 12–2 record with a 0.84 ERA and 119 strikeouts as a senior in 2017. After graduating, he first enrolled at the University of Tennessee at Martin before transferring to Dyersburg State Community College at the end of the fall semester. At Dyersburg State, he went 7–3 with a 3.64 ERA over 12 starts for the 2018 season. Following the season's end, he was selected by the Atlanta Braves in the 23rd round of the 2018 Major League Baseball draft.

Professional career

Atlanta Braves
Woods signed with Atlanta and made his professional debut with the Rookie-level Gulf Coast League Braves, going 0–1 with a 6.10 ERA over  innings. In 2019, Woods pitched for the Rome Braves of the Class A South Atlantic League in which he went 1–5 with a 3.35 ERA and 58 strikeouts over 51 innings. Woods did not play a minor league game in 2020 due to the cancellation of the season caused by the COVID-19 pandemic. He split the 2021 season between Rome and the Mississippi Braves, though he appeared in only five total games due to an elbow injury.

On November 18, 2021, the Braves selected his contract and added him to the 40-man roster. He opened the 2022 season with Mississippi. After three appearances, Woods was promoted to the Gwinnett Stripers. On April 26, 2022, Woods was called up to the major leagues. He made his MLB debut the next day, pitching a scoreless inning with one walk and one strikeout against the Chicago Cubs.

New York Mets
On November 18, 2022, the New York Mets claimed Woods off of waivers. Woods was designated for assignment by the Mets on December 27, after the signing of Adam Ottavino was made official. On January 7, 2023, Woods was sent outright to the Triple-A Syracuse Mets.

References

External links

1998 births
Living people
People from Trenton, Tennessee
Baseball players from Tennessee
Major League Baseball pitchers
Atlanta Braves players
Dyersburg State Eagles baseball players
Gulf Coast Braves players
Gwinnett Braves players
Mississippi Braves players
Rome Braves players
Peoria Javelinas players